Florian Ballas (born 8 January 1993) is a German professional footballer who plays as a centre-back for  side Karlsruher SC.

Club career 
In the summer of 2013, Ballas joined Hannover 96 from 1. FC Nürnberg. In January 2014, Ballas joined 3. Liga club 1. FC Saarbrücken on loan. In January 2015, Ballas signed for FSV Frankfurt from Hannover 96. In June 2016, Ballas left FSV Frankfurt, signing a three-year contract with Dynamo Dresden. In March 2018, he extended his contract with Dresden by a further two years.

Following the expiry of Ballas' contract in the summer of 2020, he joined 2. Bundesliga team Erzgebirge Aue on a two-year contract.

International career
Ballas is a one-time youth international for Germany, at the U19 level.

References

External links

1993 births
Living people
Sportspeople from Saarbrücken
German footballers
Association football defenders
Germany youth international footballers
1. FC Nürnberg II players
Hannover 96 players
1. FC Saarbrücken players
FSV Frankfurt players
Dynamo Dresden players
FC Erzgebirge Aue players
Karlsruher SC players
2. Bundesliga players
3. Liga players